Greater Fredericton is the name given to the area encompassing the City of Fredericton in New Brunswick, Canada and its surroundings.  Most of this area is along the Saint John River mainly on portions of Route 105, Route 102 and Route 101.  Some of the areas mentioned below are included in the area of Greater Fredericton. It is also known as Fredericton Census Agglomeration, Fredericton CA, or The Capital Region. In 2006, the population of the census agglomeration (termed "Greater Fredericton") was 94,268

List of towns, communities and cities
 Bright Parish
 Devon 30 Indian reserve
 Douglas Parish
 Fredericton
 Gladstone	Parish
 Kingsclear Parish
 Kingsclear 6 Indian reserve
 Lincoln Parish
 Maugerville Parish
 New Maryland Parish
 New Maryland Village
 Oromocto
 Saint Marys Parish

References

 
Metropolitan areas of New Brunswick
Geographic regions of New Brunswick